The 1995–96 season of the División de Honor de Futsal is the 7th season of top-tier futsal in Spain.

Regular season

League table

*Papeles Beltrán Alcantarilla was dissolved at end of season.

Playoffs

See also
División de Honor de Futsal
Futsal in Spain

External links
1995–96 season at lnfs.es

1995 96
Spain
futsal